Andrew Chaikin, better known by his stage name Kid Beyond, is an American singer, beatboxer, live looper and voice actor, based in the San Francisco area.

Early career
Chaikin attended Brown University and was a leader in the co-ed fraternity Zeta Delta Xi.  He sang in the Jabberwocks, a student a cappella group. He graduated in 1991 and moved to San Francisco to join the House Jacks with Deke Sharon, recording "Naked Noise" and "Funkwich" with the band (the latter for Tommy Boy Records).

He left the House Jacks in 1997.

In 2004, Kid Beyond made a cameo appearance as an actor in the music video "Maximum Wage", which featured music he co-created with Andrew Bancroft.

He released his first solo EP, Amplivate, in 2006.

Performances
Kid Beyond has toured nationally with Imogen Heap.  He has also performed at major music festivals, including sets at Burning Man atop a Unimog, the Langerado festival, the 2007 Wakarusa Music and Camping Festival, and Coachella.

His song "Mothership" from Amplivate was used in NBA Live 08 by EA Sports.

While opening for Buckethead in San Francisco on February 15, 2008, Kid Beyond mentioned recording vocals for "Free Bird" and other songs for Guitar Hero II.

Kid Beyond performed at the inaugural w00tstock shows at the Swedish American Hall, San Francisco, California on October 19 and 20, 2009.

He appeared on the game show Jeopardy! on November 6 & 9, 2020, winning $21,600.

Techniques
Kid Beyond's performances often include some traditional beatboxing as well as live looping.  The looped pieces make heavy use of Ableton's Live software on a laptop to layer and loop vocal and vocal percussion tracks together to create full songs.  Prior to concerts, the software is configured with the tracks that will be used in each piece, including any necessary effects and levels, but lacking any audio.  A set of MIDI controller foot pedals allow Kid Beyond to control the software during performance, enabling him to record, play, and manipulate the audio tracks with a set of predefined macros.  In some cases, a single press of a pedal performs multiple actions, such as muting one track while initializing recording on another.

In recognition of his innovative techniques, Ableton made him a featured artist on their website and presented him at a series of clinics in Germany. The associated footage was shown on a number of viral video sites.

Voice work
As Andrew Chaikin, he has performed as a voice-over artist for a number of video games and advertisements, prominently in American McGee's Alice as The Mad Hatter/The White Rabbit/The March Hare, and in the 2005 game Star Wars: Republic Commando, where he does the voices of Clone Advisor and Delta 40 "Fixer".

He also provided several voices in graphic adventure titles by Telltale Games, including Phoney Bone and Ted the bug in the Bone adaptations, a pair of suspects in CSI: 3 Dimensions of Murder, and most notably Max for the first episode "Culture Shock" of Sam & Max Season One before being replaced by William Kasten for the rest of the series due to health reasons. The Telltale Games characters include a few pirates in Tales of Monkey Island and Narrator, Papierwaite, and a Moleman in Sam & Max: The Devil's Playhouse. He also voiced Biff Tannen in Back to the Future: The Game, Grendel in The Wolf Among Us, Roman in The Walking Dead: 400 Days and Carlos in the second season of The Walking Dead.

He has also provided his vocal talents for the cover versions of the songs from Konami's Karaoke Revolution video game series starting with Karaoke Revolution Volume 2. His song "Mothership" is on Tap Tap Revenge 2. He has appeared in the official video game adaptation of Iron Man 2 as the villain Ultimo and JARVIS.

He has done multiple covers for the Guitar Hero series of video games, including "No One Knows" by Queens of the Stone Age  and "Girlfriend" by Matthew Sweet.

He appears as Penny Arcade's Tycho Brahe in Poker Night at the Inventory, making him the first actor to ever portray the character.

He voiced Dio Brando in the 2004 English dub of the JoJo's Bizarre Adventure OVA.

Awards 
Best of the Bay 2006: Best Oral in the Bay
Best of San Francisco: Best Beatboxer

Filmography

Anime dubbing

Video games

References

External links 
 
  which includes information on his voiceover work

Living people
Ableton Live users
American beatboxers
American male songwriters
American male video game actors
American male voice actors
Place of birth missing (living people)
Songwriters from California
The House Jacks members
21st-century American male actors
20th-century American male singers
21st-century American male singers
20th-century American singers
21st-century American singers
Year of birth missing (living people)